is a portal and social network for games, owned by DeNA. The service had 30 million users, who largely play on feature phones.

On February 14, 2011, DeNA announced renaming Mobage Town service name to Mobage, which also merged the Plus+ network operated by ngmoco under the new branding. Also that year, the service has been described as highly successful in academic research.

On December 19, 2014, ngmoco, LLC announced the renaming of Mobage to DeNA. However, the Japanese site still operates under the mobage name.

On August 9, 2018, the English version of the website was reportedly shut down for unknown reasons.

References

External links
Mobage page: English, Japanese

DeNA
Internet properties established in 2006
Online video game services
Japanese social networking websites